Romain Millo-Chluski (born 20 April 1983 in Ris-Orangis, Essonne) is a former rugby union player for Toulouse in the Top 14 competition. He plays as a lock.

Millo-Chluski won the 2007–08 French Rugby League Championship and both the 2004–05 and 2009–10 Heineken Cup with Toulouse. He won his first cap for France in 2005.

References

External links
Toulouse profile

1983 births
Living people
People from Ris-Orangis
French people of Polish descent
French rugby union players
Stade Toulousain players
Rugby union locks
France international rugby union players
Sportspeople from Essonne